The 2007 Japan Le Mans Challenge season was the second for the Japan Le Mans Challenge, a series created by the SERO and sanctioned by the ACO.  It began on May 13, 2007 and ended on October 27, 2007 after 4 races.

Schedule
On October 29, 2006, during the Okayama 1000 km, SERO announced their schedule for the 2007 season, adding a fourth race at Fuji.

Season results
Overall winner in bold.

External links
 JLMC Official Website (English)
 World Sports Racing Prototypes – Results

Japan Le Mans Challenge
Le Mans Challenge